William Preston McKinney known as "Old Man" Pet McKinney (1846–1926) was an American Old Time fiddler and singer and civil war veteran from Round Peak, North Carolina. During the American Civil War he fought in the 45th Virginia Regiment. Later as an old man he was a well-known musician in the Round Peak. He influenced several musicians in the area, notably Tommy Jarrell whom he taught the tune Sail Away Ladies. His granddaughter Corinna Bowden was also a musician and a friend of Tommy Jarrell.

References

1846 births
1926 deaths
People from Surry County, North Carolina
American fiddlers
Appalachian old-time fiddlers
Old-time musicians
19th-century American musicians